The 2019 Open Sopra Steria de Lyon was a professional tennis tournament played on clay courts. It was the 4th edition of the tournament which was part of the 2019 ATP Challenger Tour. It took place in Lyon, France, between 10 and 16 June 2019.

Singles main-draw entrants

Seeds

 1 Rankings are as of 27 May 2019.

Other entrants
The following players received wildcards into the singles main draw:
  Geoffrey Blancaneaux
  Antoine Cornut Chauvinc
  Hugo Gaston
  Manuel Guinard
  Matteo Martineau

The following player received entry into the singles main draw as a special exempt:
  Rudolf Molleker

The following players received entry into the singles main draw as alternates:
  Alessandro Bega
  Hugo Nys

The following players received entry into the singles main draw using their ITF World Tennis Ranking:
  Corentin Denolly
  Eduard Esteve Lobato
  Peter Heller
  Oriol Roca Batalla
  Tim van Rijthoven

The following players received entry from the qualifying draw:
  Benjamin Bonzi
  Borna Gojo

The following player received entry as a lucky loser:
  Hugo Grenier

Champions

Singles

 Corentin Moutet def.  Elias Ymer 6–4, 6–4.

Doubles

 Philipp Oswald /  Filip Polášek def.  Simone Bolelli /  Andrea Pellegrino 6–4, 7–6(7–2).

References

External links
Official Website

2019 ATP Challenger Tour
2019
2019 in French tennis
June 2019 sports events in France